Maria Igorevna Petrova (born 29 November 1977) is a Russian pair skater. With partner Alexei Tikhonov, she is the 2000 World champion and a two-time (1999, 2000) European champion

Career 
Petrova was a sickly child and her doctor recommended she take up a sport; her parents got her into figure skating when she was seven. She started out in singles but always preferred pair skating and admired Ekaterina Gordeeva / Sergei Grinkov so she made the switch to pairs at 13.

She initially competed with Anton Sikharulidze with whom she is the 1994 and 1995 World Junior Champion. They split in 1996 and she teamed up with Teimuraz Pulin, winning the silver medal at the 1997 World Junior championships.

Petrova teamed up with Alexei Tikhonov in the summer of 1998. Together, they won the World Championship in 2000. They placed 6th at the 2002 Winter Olympics and 5th at the 2006 Games. They won a silver medal at the 2005 Worlds, and a bronze in 2006.

Petrova and Tikhonov announced they would retire after the 2006 Worlds, but at the request of the Russian Skating Federation they later agreed to remain eligible for another year. During their final season, they finished 6th at the Grand Prix Final, and withdrew from the World Championships due to injury.

Petrova and Tikhonov trained in Saint Petersburg with Ludmila Velikova. After retiring from competition, they performed in ice shows, including Russian television projes.

Programs

With Tikhonov

With Sikharulidze

Competitive highlights

With Alexei Tikhonov

With Teimuraz Pulin

With Anton Sikharulidze

References

External links 

 
 Official website of Maria Petrova and Alexei Tikhonov
 
 
 

1977 births
Living people
Russian female pair skaters
Olympic figure skaters of Russia
Figure skaters at the 2002 Winter Olympics
Figure skaters at the 2006 Winter Olympics
Figure skaters from Saint Petersburg
World Figure Skating Championships medalists
European Figure Skating Championships medalists
World Junior Figure Skating Championships medalists
Universiade medalists in figure skating
Goodwill Games medalists in figure skating
Season-end world number one figure skaters
Universiade silver medalists for Russia
Competitors at the 1997 Winter Universiade
Competitors at the 2001 Goodwill Games